The Ant Bully is a 2006 American computer-animated film written and directed by John A. Davis and based on the 1999 children's book of the same name by John Nickle. Starring the voices of Julia Roberts, Nicolas Cage, Meryl Streep, Paul Giamatti, Regina King, Bruce Campbell and Lily Tomlin, it was produced by Tom Hanks and Gary Goetzman's Playtone, Davis and Keith Alcorn's DNA Productions, and Legendary Pictures in their first animated film, and distributed by Warner Bros. Pictures.

Set in suburban Las Vegas, The Ant Bully follows Lucas Nickle (Zach Tyler Eisen), a 10-year-old destructive boy who is neglected by his family (Cheri Oteri and Larry Miller) and bullied by Steve (Myles Jeffrey) and his friends (Jake T. Austin). He attacks the nearby ant colony out of frustration, but Zoc (Cage), a wizard ant, creates a potion to shrink Lucas. After being shrunk by Zoc, Lucas must join forces with his new friends (Roberts, King, and Campbell) to defeat Stan Beals (Giamatti), an exterminator who threatens their colony upon signing the contract.

Shortly before its release, most of the DNA employees were laid off and the studio was closed (as the result of their second and final film to be made after Jimmy Neutron: Boy Genius). It was also the last film role by Ricardo Montalbán, before his death on January 14, 2009. Released on July 28, 2006, The Ant Bully received mixed reviews from critics, with praise aimed at the vocal performances, animation, and humor, but criticism for its dialogue and script, its lack of faithfulness to the source material and the execution of its premise. It was also a box-office bomb, grossing $55.2 million against its $50 million budget.

Plot

10-year-old Lucas Nickle is left with his older sister, Tiffany, and his grandmother, when his parents go to Puerto Vallarta for their wedding anniversary. Neglected by his family and tormented by a local bully named Steve, Lucas takes out his frustration on an anthill and attacks it with a squirt gun, terrifying the colony. One ant, Zoc, an eccentric sorcerer, tries to fight back. His girlfriend Hova, a nurse ant who is fascinated by humans, attempts to communicate with Lucas, but she is almost crushed before being saved by Zoc. The leaders of the colony decide to use a potion Zoc has recently created to shrink Lucas down to ant size.
 
The local exterminator, Stan Beals, convinces Lucas to sign a contract to kill the vermin. Later that night, Zoc and a small troop of ants pour the potion into his ear; Lucas wakes up and discovers that he is shrunk and naked, and is carried to the anthill for the court. Zoc insists that Lucas should be studied then eaten, but he is overruled by the Queen, who sentences the human to hard labor. Hova volunteers to train Lucas alongside her friends Kreela and Fugax, much to Zoc's mortification, and they both learn about the differences between ants and humans. The ants are later attacked by tarantula hawks. Lucas finds a firecracker discarded by Steve and uses it to scare the wasps away. This earns him the admiration of all the ants except Zoc.

Lucas is shown a painting that depicts the Great Ant Mother and the Cloud-Breather, and is told that the Great Ant Mother will return and shower the ants with honeydew, while the Cloud-Breather will spell destruction for all of them. Realizing the Cloud-Breather is actually the exterminator, Lucas convinces Hova, Fugax, and Kreela to go to his house for jelly beans, while he attempts to cancel Beals' contract, but unknowningly calls a pizzeria instead.  Tiffany enters the kitchen and attacks Lucas and company before they flee through the sink pipe.

When Zoc finds out that Lucas put Hova in possible danger, he tells Lucas that he will never turn him back to his normal size, causing Lucas to run away in fright. Hearing what happened, Hova gets angry at Zoc, scolding him for banishing Lucas only because of his prejudice towards humans, and goes out to look for Lucas with Kreela and Fugax. Once she finds him, he is swallowed by a frog. Zoc witnesses the event and realizes how much Hova cares about Lucas, so he frees him by making the frog to burp. Afterwards, they discuss their differences. Zoc explains that ants work for the benefit of the colony, whilst Lucas states that humans mostly work for personal gain. Lucas also admits that his actions against the colony wasn't intended, and that he simply didn't think through what he was doing, which Zoc understands and sympathises with. 

The next day, when Beals arrives to exterminate the colony, Lucas and Zoc enlist the wasps' aid; at first, the wasps want to eat them, but upon hearing that their hill is being destroyed by Beals, they agree to help. During the battle with Beals, Lucas saves the lives of Hova and an injured wasp. When Beals is about to exterminate the anthill with pesticide, a beetle and glowworm that Zoc and Lucas met while trapped inside of the frog's stomach, bite him in the groin. As he painfully doubles up, Lucas injects him with the shrinking potion, severely disfiguring Beals, and he retreats on a tricycle while being attacked by the wasps.

The Queen pronounces Lucas an ant in honor for his heroic actions, naming him "Rokai", and Zoc gives him the antidote. He returns to normal size, reunites and reconciles with his mother, and finally stands up to Steve, whose friends choose to befriend Lucas after Steve insults them. Lucas then showers the colony with jelly beans as a parting gift.

Voice cast

Additional voices were provided by Tyler James Williams, Jake Goldberg, Austin Majors, Jaishon Fisher, Tom Kenny, Neil Ross, Bob Joles, Wally Wingert, Leon Morenzie, Johnathan Cook, Clive Robertson, S. Scott Bullock, Susan Silo, Zack Shada, Max Burkholder, Benjamin Bryan, Jordan Orr, Candi Milo, Nika Futterman, Colin Ford, Nicole Sullivan, Paul Greenberg, and David Kaye.

Production
Tom Hanks originally conceived the idea for an animated film adaptation after reading the book with his child. He then sent a copy to John A. Davis due to Davis' work on the computer-animated film Jimmy Neutron: Boy Genius. Davis came up with a potential take on the story within a few days. "To be honest, when I first looked at it, I thought Oh, why does it have to be ants again?" said Davis. "But the more I thought about it, I said, So what? It's got as much to do with The Incredible Shrinking Man as it does the other bug movies. It's a completely different story."

Hanks agreed that the story could be expanded considerably (the original book being around only 2,000 words). Keith Alcorn had a similar initial reaction to the project as Davis did. "My first thought," recalled Alcorn, "was, 'not another ant movie.' But looking at the actual story, this was really about a little boy and how he learns about the world by having to live beneath the surface." Davis states that he felt like something of a hypocrite when, while he was working on the script, carpenter ants infested his house and he called an exterminator.

The film was rendered on DNA Productions' 1400-CPU render farm, managed by the open-source Sun Grid Engine job scheduler. The nodes started out with Fedora Core 2 Linux with a modern 2.6.x kernel, but the new AMD Opteron nodes are running Fedora Core 4. Most of the applications are commercial, including Maya, Lightwave 3D, Houdini, Massive and Pixar’s RenderMan.

Along with the theatrical release of The Ant Bully,  an IMAX 3D version was presented in only some of the IMAX theaters. The others continued to run the 3D version of Superman Returns. The special IMAX 3D version was remastered in three dimensions with IMAX DMR. Critics within the 3D motion-picture community have given the film high marks, as unlike Superman Returns, the entire film is projected in 3D stereo. The process to turn a pure animation film into 3D is much simpler than converting a film having live actors. Some of the production took place at C.O.R.E. Digital Pictures in Canada.

Release
The film was theatrically released on July 28, 2006 by Warner Bros. Pictures, and was released on DVD and Blu-ray on November 28, 2006, by Warner Home Video.

Reception

Critical response
Review aggregation website Rotten Tomatoes reported a 62% approval rating, based on 118 reviews, with an average rating of 6.2/10. The website's consensus reads, "Sometimes inventive and witty, this animated adventure into an ant-sized world is a pleasant diversion." On Metacritic, the film has a score of 59/100 based on 26 reviews, indicating "mixed or average reviews". Audiences surveyed by CinemaScore gave the film a grade "A−" on scale of A to F.

Tom Long of the Detroit News wrote, "there's a sweet simplicity and humility to this film."

Ruthe Stein of The San Francisco Chronicle wrote that "the brilliance of The Ant Bully is in the crafty way it delves into the minds of ants as they plot to save themselves from extermination...Davis creates a marvelously labyrinthine society for them, right below the surface of a bland suburb."

Lisa Schwarzbaum of Entertainment Weekly liked Roberts and Cage in their roles, and referred to Streep's queen ant as "excellently magisterial". She also wrote that "the kind of life lessons that usually gum up the fun go down as easily as jelly beans in The Ant Bully." Jeffrey E. McCants of the Minneapolis Star Tribune wrote that "the film's heavy-handed lessons turn it from a fun romp through a cartoonish insect world to a predictable and preachy snoozefest".

Lou Lumenick of the New York Post called the film "generic" and wrote that "adults will be less than enchanted by its preachiness, talkiness, and Communist Party-line political views". Bill Muller of The Arizona Republic wrote, "The Ant Bully, in trying to match Antz or A Bug's Life, just digs itself into a big hole."

Jack Mathews of the New York Daily News was positive about the film's lack of pop-culture references and thought that the film does not "talk down" to children. Additionally, he noted, "adults may be amused (or maybe not) by the Christian parallel in the ants' religion."

Box office
The film opened at number  five on July 28, 2006, and closed on November 16, 2006, with $28 million in North America and a total of $55 million worldwide. The estimated production budget was $50 million. The film was released in the United Kingdom on August 4, 2006, and only opened on number eight.

Music

The soundtrack's music score was composed and conducted by John Debney, who previously worked with Davis on Jimmy Neutron: Boy Genius. This film has no songs.

Video game

Games publisher Midway released The Ant Bully, the official video game tie-in to the film on GameCube, PlayStation 2, Microsoft Windows, and Game Boy Advance on July 24, 2006. A Wii version was released on December 5, 2006. The game was developed by the Montreal Studio Artificial Mind and Movement.

See also
 List of films featuring miniature people
 ''FernGully: The Last Rainforest

References

External links

 
 
 
 
 
 

2006 films
2006 computer-animated films
2006 3D films
3D animated films
2000s adventure comedy films
2000s American animated films
2000s fantasy comedy films
2000s fantasy adventure films
2006 comedy films
American 3D films
American adventure comedy films
American children's animated adventure films
American children's animated comedy films
American children's animated fantasy films
American computer-animated films
American fantasy adventure films
Animated films about insects
Animated films based on children's books
DNA Productions films
Fictional ants
Films about size change
Films scored by John Debney
Films about bullying
Films directed by John A. Davis
Films produced by Tom Hanks
Films produced by Gary Goetzman
Films set in the Las Vegas Valley
IMAX films
Playtone films
Warner Bros. films
Warner Bros. animated films
Legendary Pictures films
Films with screenplays by John A. Davis
Films about ants
2000s English-language films